In set theory, the critical point of an elementary embedding of a transitive class into another transitive class is the smallest ordinal which is not mapped to itself.

Then  must take ordinals to ordinals and  must be strictly increasing. Also .

Specifically, one may take the filter to be . However,  might be different from the ultrapower(s) arising from such filter(s).

If the transitive class  is an inner model of ZFC and  has no critical point, i.e. every ordinal maps to itself, then  is trivial.

References

Large cardinals